Záriečie is a village and municipality in Púchov District in the Trenčín Region of north-western Slovakia.

History
In historical records, the village was first mentioned in 1475.

Geography
The municipality lies at an altitude of 323 metres and covers an area of 9.418 km2. It has a population of about 680 people.

External links
 
 
http://www.statistics.sk/mosmis/eng/run.html

Zariece